Pangeran Cinta is the fourth album by Indonesia pop band ST 12. Lead single from this album is Aku Padamu.

Track listing 
 Terlalu
 Setiaku
 Aku Padamu
 Dunia Pasti Berputar
 Pangeran Cinta
 Masa Kecil
 Lady Sky
 Aku Terjatuh
 Anugerah Cinta
 I Love You
 Sayyidina
 Sebuah Kenyataan

References 

ST 12 albums
2010 albums